For information on all Western Kentucky University sports, see Western Kentucky Hilltoppers

The Western Kentucky Hilltoppers baseball team is a varsity intercollegiate athletic team of Western Kentucky University in Bowling Green, Kentucky, United States. The team is a member of Conference USA, which is part of the National Collegiate Athletic Association's Division I. Western Kentucky's first baseball team was fielded in 1910. The team plays its home games at Nick Denes Field in Bowling Green, Kentucky. The Hilltoppers are coached by Marc Rardin.

Hilltoppers in Major League Baseball
Since the Major League Baseball Draft began in 1965, Western Kentucky has had 59 players selected.

See also
List of NCAA Division I baseball programs

References

External links
 

Sports clubs established in 1910